is a passenger railway station in located in the city of Kishiwada, Osaka Prefecture, Japan, operated by West Japan Railway Company (JR West).

Lines

Station layout
The station consists of two opposed side platforms connected to the station building by a level crossing. The station is staffed.

Platforms

Adjacent stations

|-
!colspan=5|JR West

History
Shimomatsu Station opened on 1 April 1984. With the privatization of the Japan National Railways (JNR) on 1 April 1987, the station came under the aegis of the West Japan Railway Company.

Station numbering was introduced in March 2018 with Shimomatsu being assigned station number JR-R39.

Passenger statistics
In fiscal 2019, the station was used by an average of 3,878 passengers daily (boarding passengers only).

Surrounding Area
 Osaka Prefectural Road No. 30 Osaka Izumi Sennan Line
Osaka Prefectural Kumeda High School
Municipal Kishiwada Municipal Hospital 
Kishiwada City Industrial High School

See also
List of railway stations in Japan

References

External links

 Shimomatsu Station Official Site

Railway stations in Osaka Prefecture
Railway stations in Japan opened in 1984
Kishiwada, Osaka